The 2016–17 GFA League First Division is the 48th season of top-tier football in Gambia. The season began on 19 November 2016 and concluded on 29 May 2017.

Standings

References

GFA League First Division seasons
Premier League
Premier League
Gambia